Komeda is a crater near the south pole of the planet Mercury. Its name was adopted by the International Astronomical Union (IAU) on the December 19, 2012. Komeda is named for the Polish composer Krzysztof Komeda.

References

Impact craters on Mercury